The Spirit of Youth is a 1929 American silent drama film directed by Walter Lang. A complete print of the film exists.

Cast
 Dorothy Sebastian as Betty Grant
 Larry Kent as Jim Kenney
 Betty Francisco as Claire Ewing
 Maurice Murphy as Ted Ewing
 Anita Louise as Toodles Ewing (as Anita Fremault)
 Donald Hall as Mr. Ewing
 Douglas Gilmore as Hal Loring
 Charles Sullivan as Prizefighter
 Sidney D'Albrook as Fight Promoter

References

External links
 

1929 films
1929 drama films
Silent American drama films
American silent feature films
1920s English-language films
American black-and-white films
Films directed by Walter Lang
Tiffany Pictures films
1920s American films